Villeneuve-sur-Cher is a commune in the Cher department in the Centre-Val de Loire region of France.

Geography

Population

Sights
 The church of St. Pierre, dating from the twelfth century.
 The fifteenth-century fortified house.
 The seventeenth-century manorhouse at Galifart.
 The medieval Beau tower.

See also
Communes of the Cher department

References

Communes of Cher (department)